Sreepur is a city in Bangladesh. Sreepur also may refer to:

Bangladesh
 Sreepur Upazila, Gazipur
 Sreepur Upazila, Magura

India
 Sreepur, Mahakali

See also
 Sripur (disambiguation)